Super angel (or "super-angel") was a term used in the early 2010s to describe venture capital investors who had once been angel investors and subsequently raised small venture capital funds.

Super angels share some characteristics of both angel investors and venture capitalists. According to Fast Company, super angels "raise funds like venture capitalists but invest early like angels and in sums between the two, on average from $250,000 to $500,000." Unlike traditional angel investors, they are typically professionals for whom investing is their primary occupation.

Features
Some common features of super angels include:
 Creating a professionally managed investment fund
 Serial investing (investing in numerous startup companies)
 Investing at a seed round in startup companies
 Funding rounds in the (approximate) range of $50,000 to several million dollars, larger than typical "friends and family" rounds but smaller than most venture rounds
 Taking an active role in portfolio companies
 Raising money from general partners and other principals, without passive investors in the fund
 Fund principals who are experienced entrepreneurs
 Avoid joining boards as a long-term investor.
 Close investments in several weeks, considerably faster than venture funds.

List of investors described as super angels

References

External links
 Superangels VC

Private equity
Venture capital
Main